Rolando Manrique Blackburn Ortega (born 9 January 1990) is a Panamanian professional footballer who plays as a striker for Primera División club FAS and the Panama national team.

Club career
Born in San Joaquín, Panamá, he started his career at Tauro and had a spell abroad with Guatemalan side Juventud Retalteca, before joining Chorrillo after financial troubles struck Juventud.

FK Senica
In January 2012, he joined Slovak club Senica on loan from Chorrillo. Blackburn made his official debut for the club in 2–0 win over Slovan Bratislava in quarterfinals round of the Slovak Cup, on 7 March 2012. He returned from loan after one and a half year in Europe.

Comunicaciones
Nicknamed el Toro (the Bull), he joined Guatemalan giants Comunicaciones in 2014 and scored 10 goals in his first season.

International career
Blackburn made his debut for Panama in a December 2010 friendly match against Honduras. He represented his country at the 2013 Copa Centroamericana and the 2013 CONCACAF Gold Cup.

In May 2018, he was named in Panama's preliminary 35-man squad for the 2018 World Cup in Russia. However, he did not make the final 23.

International goals
Scores and results list Panama's goal tally first.

Personal life
Born to parents Rolando and Vanesa, Blackburn is married to Yarkanis. They have a daughter.

Honours

References

External links
 
 
 
 Rolando Blackburn at The Players Agent

1990 births
Living people
People from Chepo District
Association football forwards
Panamanian footballers
Panama international footballers
2013 Copa Centroamericana players
2013 CONCACAF Gold Cup players
2015 CONCACAF Gold Cup players
2017 Copa Centroamericana players
Tauro F.C. players
Unión Deportivo Universitario players
Juventud Retalteca players
FK Senica players
Comunicaciones F.C. players
Deportivo Saprissa players
Sporting Cristal footballers
The Strongest players
Rolando Blackburn
Slovak Super Liga players
Liga Nacional de Fútbol de Guatemala players
Liga Panameña de Fútbol players
Liga FPD players
Peruvian Primera División players
Bolivian Primera División players
Rolando Blackburn
2019 CONCACAF Gold Cup players
Panamanian expatriate footballers
Expatriate footballers in Guatemala
Expatriate footballers in Slovakia
Expatriate footballers in Costa Rica
Expatriate footballers in Peru
Expatriate footballers in Thailand
Expatriate footballers in Bolivia
Panamanian expatriate sportspeople in Guatemala
Panamanian expatriate sportspeople in Slovakia
Panamanian expatriate sportspeople in Costa Rica
Panamanian expatriate sportspeople in Peru
Panamanian expatriate sportspeople in Bolivia
Panamanian expatriate sportspeople in Thailand